The Zögling is a German high-wing, cable-braced, single seat primary glider that was designed by Alexander Lippisch in 1926 and produced with many variations by a variety of manufacturers.

Design and development
The Zögling was designed to be a training glider for basic flight training. The usual launch method was by bungee cord from a sloped hill. Because training was conducted solely by solo flight the aircraft had to be very easy to fly and also easy to repair.

The high-wing design uses a kingpost and cable bracing. The primary structure of the glider is of wood, with the wings, tail surfaces and inverted "V" kingpost all finished in doped aircraft fabric covering. The pilot sits on a simple seat in the open air, without a windshield.

Variants
D.D. Zögling
RRG-1 Zögling
DFS Zögling 33
DFS Zögling 1
Lippisch Zögling
Teichfuss L.T.30
G 101 production in Sweden
Kegel Zögling copies or licence production by Kegel-Flugzeugbau Kassel, using the 'AK' logo on the King-post.

Aircraft on display
National Soaring Museum, Elmira, New York, United States
US Southwest Soaring Museumreplica fuselage only

Specifications (Zögling)

See also

References

External links

Zögling photos in the National Soaring Museum

1920s German sailplanes
Lippisch aircraft
Glider aircraft
High-wing aircraft
Aircraft first flown in 1926